Minhajul Arfin Azad is an Indian Trinamool Congress politician and farmer. He has been serving as a member of the West Bengal Legislative Assembly for Chakulia since May 2021.

Early life and family
Minhajul Arfin Azad was born to a Bengali Muslim family from Chakulia, Uttar Dinajpur district. His father's name is Atiur Rahman Azad. In 2001, Azad graduated from the Bhupendra Narayan Mandal University in Laloonagar, Madhepura, Bihar with a Bachelor of Arts in Geography.

Career
He contested in 2021 West Bengal Legislative Assembly election from Chakulia Vidhan Sabha and won the seat on 2 May 2021.

References

Living people
1971 births
21st-century Indian politicians
21st-century Bengalis
Trinamool Congress politicians from West Bengal
West Bengal MLAs 2021–2026
Members of the West Bengal Legislative Assembly
People from Uttar Dinajpur district